Fearghal mac Domhnuill Ruaidh mac an Bhaird, Gaelic-Irish bardic poet, died 1550.

A member of the Donegal branch of the learned Mac an Bhaird family. His son was the poet Fearghal Óg Mac an Bhaird.

He is known as the author of only one surviving composition, a poem of one hundred and forty-eight lines which concludes thus:

References

 Manuscript sources, Castlerea, County Roscommon, Clonalis House, Book of the O'Conor Don.
 Duanta Fearghal Óg Mhic An Bhaird in Irish Bardic Poetry, Ed. Osborn Bergin, Dublin Institute for Advanced Studies (1970) page 37-48

External links
 http://www.celt.dias.ie/publications/celtica/c24/c24-252-263.pdf
 http://www.ucc.ie/celt/published/G402071/index.html

16th-century Irish-language poets
People from County Donegal
Year of death unknown
Year of birth unknown